Sydney Island may refer to:

 Manra Island, one of the Phoenix Islands, Kiribati
 Sydney Island (Queensland), one of the Wellesley Islands in Australia